KD Singh Foundation is an Indian private foundation established in March 2013 by Dr. K.D. Singh, Member of Parliament, Rajya Sabha. It's statutory aims are in the field of women empowerment, education, and health.

Organization 
The K D singh Foundation is a private foundation headquartered in Gurgaon, Haryana, India with a vision to transform victims of sexual abuse to lead a healthy and happy life after the incident.

The cell engages with survivors to provide them with adequate medical, legal and rehabilitation aid to enable them to seek justice and restore their life. The rape cell provided aid to 113 rape victims across 17 districts in Haryana till November 2013.

Currently the foundation is expanding its operations including educational counselling for young men and women in rural Haryana, awareness workshops on maternal health, medical camps and other forms of educational and health related community initiatives.

Projects

Support Cell for Rape Victims
With the alarming rise of crimes against woman the foundation established a Support Cell for Rape Victims wherein comprehensive support is offered to rape survivors including but not limited to the state of Haryana. The foundation was born out of a clear vision on 25 March 2013 to provide every necessary rehabilitation and relief support to rape survivors.
The foundation comprehensively supports survivors helping them legally, medically, financially and psychologically. Until now, KD Singh Foundation has offered free medical support to 5 rape survivors, legal support to 73 and education support to 5 rape survivors. The foundation has also promised educational support to 63 survivors, Vocational Training support to 12 and marriage support to 28 rape survivors.
The Cell operates a toll-free help line number 1800-200-2056 where victims or anyone who is a witness to such crime can contact 24*7 and report a rape

Youth Counselling Center
Haryana is one such state where unemployment among youth is rampantly visible. Falling levels of education coupled with no improvement in the number of dedicated centres for skill development. Henceforth, the idea of setting up the Youth counselling emerged with an objective of empowering and emancipating youth for heralding a new era on the face of India. 
The foundation is collaborating with the United States-based Khan Academy for providing easy and free education to underprivileged youth in Haryana. It is one of the first initiatives to provide high quality video based learning in rural areas in India.

KD Singh Scholarships

KD Singh Scholarships are for women students at Panjab University, Chandigarh. This scholarships are aimed towards woman applicants from less privileged backgrounds pursuing women studies, development studies or peace studies at the University. The scholarship covers the tuition fees of the recipients. The tenure of the scholarship is for the entire duration of the holder’s degree requirements. The first round of scholarships will be provided for 2014-15 academic session. Applications will be invited from 1 March 2014 and will be awarded to 5 women students.

References

Foundations based in India
Organizations established in 2013